Bani Jabr is a sub-district located in Dhi Bin District, 'Amran Governorate, Yemen. Bani Jabr had a population of 13114 according to the 2004 census.

References 

Sub-districts in Dhi Bin District